Scorponok is a major antagonist whose name is shared by several fictional characters throughout the various Transformers universes. Characters with this name are usually Decepticons or Predacons that turn into robotic scorpions or have scorpion-shaped robot modes. Some versions of the character are also known as Megazarak or Black Zarak in Japan.

Transformers: Generation 1
Leader of the Decepticon Headmasters, Scorponok is binary-bonded to Lord Zarak, the leader of an evil faction of Nebulons, and wields an anti-gravity gun in robot mode. A Triple Changer, Scorponok's primary alternate mode is that of a giant scorpion, with claws that can crush mountains and a tail that fires deadly electric blasts. His third mode is a defense base, outfitted with assorted tracking and communication equipment, repair and construction bays, as well as copious amounts of weaponry. His base mode is patrolled by Fasttrack, a partially autonomous armoured vehicle that can transform into a robot mode armed with twin photon cannons.

Marvel Comics
In the U.S. Marvel Comics comics, Scorponok first appeared in the four-issue Headmasters mini-series, which introduced the new breed of warrior to the Transformers universe. In this series Scorponok was leader of a troop of Decepticons who were summoned to the planet Nebulos by Lord Zarak, a corrupt politician who was intent on removing Fortress Maximus and other Autobots who had previously settled on the planet.

Scorponok was among the Decepticon troops who first met with the Nebulans led by Zarak in the Transformers U.K. Annual 1988 story Doomsday for Nebulos.

As the Headmaster and Targetmaster processes escalated the Transformers' conflict on Nebulos, Zarak realized that their war threatened to destroy the planet and its peaceful inhabitants. To that end, he orchestrated events leading to both Autobot and Decepticon forces travelling to Earth.

Upon their arrival, (in issue #38 of the main Transformers series) Scorponok's group continued its rivalry with the Autobots led by Fortress Maximus and Zarak's former political rival, Galen. After succeeding in killing Galen (Maximus's Nebulan partner), he was shocked to see the Autobot commander controlled by Spike Witwicky, the human he tortured hours earlier.

In issue #49 (part 3 of "The Underbase Saga"), Scorponok met up with the Earthbound Decepticons controlled by Ratbat. The meeting was arranged by Starscream, privately in the hopes of playing the two groups against one another. According to his wishes, the alliance between Scorponok and Ratbat broke down after Scorponok's disapproval of Ratbat's specist beliefs about humans (as Scorponok was now partially human himself) and witnessing the capture and torture of Buster Witwicky (ironically, the brother of the human he earlier harassed). When Scorponok's attempt to leave was met with an assault by the Predacons, that was all his troops needed to wage a civil war against their fellow Decepticons. The battle came to a close as Autobots responded to a distress signal (attached to a freed Buster) left by Starscream and again as Starscream's Underbase-powered fury was waged against them all.

Scorponok added the Earthbound Decepticons to his own forces after he destroyed Ratbat. His ship now destroyed, he quickly set up a new base of operations beneath the New Jersey swamps. Morale was low due to their recent failures. It only worsened when he accepted Starscream back into their ranks, after the recently rebuilt Decepticon had again assaulted them (this time being controlled by Megatron). In issue #69, "Eye of the Storm", Mindwipe and Triggerhappy (key members of Scorponok's inner circle) abandoned him after his re-inclusion of Starscream—a final straw for the two, injured by Starscream's previous assaults. They were then forcibly recruited by Shockwave, Starscream and Ravage to take part in an attempted coup.

The coup came to a close when Scorponok attained the surrender of Optimus Prime just prior to the climactic battle with Unicron. During that battle, Zarak's courage wavered and he began to flee until realizing that honor demanded him to stand and fight.

He was destroyed by Unicron during one final attack, after which he was told by Optimus Prime that he had "done good".

While that would be the last the U.S. comics saw of Scorponok, he put in one additional appearance in the U.K. comics. In a possible future (told from the perspective of an aged Rodimus Prime) Scorponok battled against Shockwave and Megatron for leadership of the Decepticons. Losing, and attacked by the Micromaster Air Strike Patrol, Scorponok surrendered to Hot Rod – only to manipulate him and his comrades into defending a human settlement from the Decepticons while he escaped. This would be his last appearance in the Marvel timeline.

Animated series
In the English cartoon, Scorponok and Lord Zarak only appeared in the three-part episode "The Rebirth", comprising the entirety of the show's fourth season and concluding the American run of the original cartoon era.

Lord Zarak was the supreme leader of the Hive, an evil dictatorship that ruled the planet of Nebulos and saw the populace as their slaves. Each of the eleven Hive members possessed telepathic/telekinetic control over machines, which they controlled worldwide to subjugate the Nebulans, moving to a subterranean city as their powers developed. But as the strength of their minds grew, the Hive's bodies withered away and became useless, to the extent that some members of the group apparently no longer even possess organic forms, only robotic shells which house their brains. Zarak himself retains his body, but despite his muscular build, may be paraplegic (he is never seen walking without his Headmaster suit) and possibly blind in one eye (one eye is always drawn either shut or solid white).

With the arrival of the Transformers to Nebulos, and the fusion of a group of Autobots and Nebulan rebels into Headmasters, Zarak masterminded a scheme to duplicate the process with Decepticons. Unable to control the Decepticons directly with their mental powers, the Hive were able to subdue them with their own machines and force them into the scheme, striking a deal to create both Headmasters and Targetmasters. With his fellow Hive members binary bonded to the Decepticons, Zarak then turned his attention to himself, reconstructing the Hive's entire subterranean city into a giant Transformer, Scorponok, to which he then bonded himself as Headmaster partner. Scorponok emerged in the midst of a battle between the Autobots and Decepticons, capturing Arcee, who was currently holding the key to the Plasma Energy Chamber, and departing for Cybertron with the Decepticons on board. The key was subsequently used by Galvatron to open the Plasma Energy Chamber while Scorponok transformed to his robot mode and battled with Fortress Maximus. Escaping into space with the Decepticons aboard as the chamber opened, Scorponok was struck by a tendril of plasma energy, and sent hurtling off into the depths of space. In the end, it became clear that Zarak had intended to take leadership of the Decepticons for himself, though the series ended just as this was hinted at. Zarak reappears in Generation 2: Redux, a Botcon magazine which is set after the events of the final episode as a flashback with Galvatron where they took the Decepticons in deep space only to be pursued by Optimus Prime and the first generation of Autobots.

Zarak's voice is supplied by Stan Jones. Scorponok speaks only one line of dialogue - "Autobots! Die!" - provided by Stephen Keener.

Transformers: Headmasters
Whereas in the US, "The Rebirth" concluded the cartoon series, in Japan, it was decided to continue producing new episodes. To that end the events of "The Rebirth" were disregarded, and a new series, titled Transformers: The Headmasters was created, following on one year after the end of the show's third season. In Japan, the Headmaster process is different from that in the US fiction – here there are no Nebulons, and there is only one mind involved. The Headmasters are small robots who connect to larger, lifeless bodies called Transtectors. Here, Zarak (known as Scorponok in Japan) is one such robot. In Transformers: The Headmasters, Zarak's (small) body more closely resembles his toy form than the art style of his U.S. and Marvel Comics counterparts.

Having fled Cybertron with many fellow Transformers under the command of Fortress during the Autobot/Decepticon war, Zarak was among the Cybertronians who settled on the harsh world of Planet Master. The brutal environments of the world necessitated that the Transformers construct new, stronger bodies for themselves in order to survive, connecting to them as heads. The process was accomplished, but several of the resultant "Headmasters" chafed under Fortress's leadership, and sided with Zarak against him. Eventually, however, they were defeated and forced off the planet.

In 2011, Zarak made contact with Galvatron, the current Decepticon leader, and he and his Headmaster minions joined him in their new attack on Cybertron. Appearing only in shadow for quite some time, Scorponok schemed to take leadership of the Decepticons for himself. When Galvatron led a raid on Cybertron acquire the new super-alloy, Cybertonuron, Zarak - fearful of the power Galvatron could acquire with it, and tired of the disrespect heaped upon him by Galvatron - lured Galvatron to the core of Cybertron, where a bomb his forces had previously planted was detonated, destroying much of the planet and apparently killing Galvatron.

Zarak subsequently took command of the Decepticons, lying and claiming that he knew where Galvatron was, and that he had been appointed to lead. Zarak then had the Decepticons acquire an Earth satellite, the Solar One, which could harness solar energy, and used it to direct the sun's energy to a small world he had enslaved in a dark nebula off in space, where he was having a massive Transtector constructed for himself. With the Transtector now powered up by the solar energy, Zarak initiated a plan of his own, scheming to blow up Mars and harness the plasma energy released. To stop the Autobots, Zarak boarded his Transtector and travelled to Mars, where combined with it to battle Fortress Maximus, proclaiming that he was no longer Zarak - now, he was Scorponok (renamed MegaZarak in Japan).

Scorponok's leadership was cut short before it even began as Galvatron returned during his coronation ceremony and reclaimed his throne, relegating Scorponok to an insulting status, using him simply as transport from planet to planet as the Decepticons ransacked numerous worlds for their energy. Upon return to Earth, however, Galvatron was killed and buried in the Arctic battling the Autobot Headmasters, allowing Scorponok to seize power once more as the new leader of the Decepticons. To combat the power of Fortress Maximus's Master Sword, Scorponok led an attack on Planet Master, where he acquired the powerful G-Metal and constructed the Zarak Shield to counter the Master Sword. Returning to Earth once more, Scorponok put his plan to destroy the planet into motion. Operating out of the lost continent of Lemuria, Scorponok raised towers composed of the city's powerful "Crysmag" metal all across the world, which began to tear the planet apart, channelling the plasma energy into an orbiting satellite, which directed it into Scorponok's Transtector. In a final battle at the North Pole, Fortress Maximus was energised by the power of all his fellow Autobots, and cleaved Scorponok's Transtector in half (after which it exploded), stopping the process and saving the planet.

Transformers: Super-God Masterforce
Japan followed up Headmasters with another exclusive series the following year, titled Transformers: Super-God Masterforce, which featured a character named Black Zarak, whose toy was a remoulded, repainted Scorponok, with a new head/helmet and "Tyrant Spear" accessory as large as the figure itself. The toy itself is of note among collectors due to its nature as a Japanese exclusive and often sells for double the price of the original Scorponok. Unlike the original figure, the Headmaster toy component does not need to be attached as the helmet has a face of its own. However, the toy features a heavy downside – the gold plastic parts (the dual guns, the gun shield, the shield/tower, the feet, the Headmaster component (Zarak/Scorponok) and Guardminder, BlackZarak's version of Fasttrack) are very brittle, and can break from even the slightest handling.

Although not explained in the main 42 episodes of the animated series itself, Black Zarak was revealed to actually be Scorponok in an additional clip episode, produced after the end of the series. After the destruction of his original Transtector by Fortress Maximus, Zarak had a new body constructed for himself - smaller in size than his original (although it was still much larger than most of the other transformers in that series), but stronger and with super-dense armour – but before being able to connect with it, he was captured and brainwashed by the evil energy entity and self-styled "Decepticon God", Devil Z, putting him under his control. He was then dispatched back into outer space, to join the Decepticon forces warring with the Autobots further off in the galaxy. When the smaller, Earth-based Autobot/Decepticon conflict began to escalate Black Zarak was summoned to Earth by Devil Z to join his forces there. The Autobot, Grand Maximus, reached the planet ahead of him, in order to warn Earth's Autobots of his approach. Black Zarak soon arrived on Earth's moon for a rendezvous with Overlord, and a battle erupted as they were attacked by God Ginrai and Grand Maximus. The battle was hard-fought, but God Ginrai succeeded in decapitating Black Zarak, only for the still-functioning villain to flee back into space.

During this period in space, Black Zarak mastered localised gravity manipulation, gaining the power to create black holes that he could use to transport himself great distances - and of course, his first stop was Earth. After the Autobots countered a series of Black Zarak's attacks on cities across the globe, including a space-based attack using the mighty ozone-depleting weapon, the Death-Para Machine, they located and invaded the Decepticon base, prompting Devil Z to take the next step to enhance his and Black Zarak's abilities; by fusing together with him. The Devil Z/Black Zarak hybrid blew up the Decepticon base in a failed attempted to destroy the Autobots, and led the Decepticons' renewed attacks on the Earth with his mighty "Devil Thunder" power, seeking to wipe out humanity, fearful of the unpredictable power of their strength and spirit. Overlord, however, acknowledged and celebrated this power - at least within himself - and for that, Black Zarak turned upon him, prompting God Ginrai to rescue him from the monster's clutches. In God Ginrai's final battle with Black Zarak, he again decapitated the villain, only to have him reveal a new transformation, assuming the form of a two-headed hydra. With his God Fire Guts attack, God Ginrai successfully destroyed BlackZarak, and then, infused with the additional power of Shuta, Cab and Minerva, performed the Final Fire Guts technique to destroy Devil Z, forcing the surviving Decepticons to flee the planet.

Although the toy includes Zarak as a Headmaster, Black Zarak is not a Headmaster in the series itself, proving the fact by being decapitated and continuing to function on two occasions. The companion manga in TV Magazine provides the answer to this mystery - Zarak does not "Head On" with his Black Zarak body, but is actually fully integrated as part of it within the chest compartment.

Transformers: Zone
Through the power of Zone Energy, Black Zarak was later resurrected by the mysterious insectoid being called Violenjiger in 1990s Transformers: Zone along with eight other great Decepticon generals (the others being Devastator, Menasor, Bruticus, Predaking, Piranacon, Trypticon, Overlord and Abominus). They were dispatched by the alien Violenjiger to harvest Zone Energy. They were defeated by Dai Atlas.

Beast Wars II: Lio Convoy's Close Call!
A being known as Majin Zarak was subsequently summoned to the planet Gaea by accident by the Predacon forces under Galvatron, who had intended to recover the Beast Wars version of Megatron to join him. Galvatron is immensely pleased by this development and begins using Majin Zarak as a new base, easily overpowering Lio Convoy's Maximals. However, Majin Zarak is eventually revealed to be entirely sentient, and attacks the Maximals only to be thwarted by the combined efforts of Lio and Optimus Primal, both of whom assume super-powered forms and combine their powers to destroy him.

"Ask Vector Prime" later revealed that this Majin Zarak was once a version of Scorponok, who during an attempt to harvest energy from across time and space was fused with his aircraft carrier base and driven insane. He was soon given a new name from the Covenant of Primus, and eventually driven off the planet by the Autobots and Decepticons. There would follow a rampage across the galaxy resulting in the destruction of numerous planets, before he was brought to Galvatron's universe and destroyed ... or so it seemed.

Another story in Transformers Legends manga revealed a separate origin where Majin Zarak is another Transtector body of Scorponok who tried to harvest the dream energies of the Legends World. But since a future version of Lio Convoy now called Leo Prime who traveled back in time said if Majin Zarak was destroyed before its showdown with Lio Convoy and Optimus Primal could trigger a paradox so Alpha Trion opened a portal big enough to send Majin Zarak to another universe and taking Scroponok with it and not interfere with history.

Books
Scorponok appeared in the 1988 Ladybird Books story Decepticons at the Pole by John Grant. In this story he was the base for the Decepticons.

Scorponok was among the Decepticons featured in the 1988 book and audio adventure Autobot Hostage by Ladybird Books.

Dreamwave Productions
When civil war broke out on the planet Cybertron between the Autobots and Decepticons, Scorponok joined with the Decepticons under Megatron. A powerful warrior and leader among the troops, he quickly rose in rank among Decepticon forces. In homage to his original Marvel portrayal, his Dreamwave tech spec indicated he was a formidable warrior, but with a keen sense of honor.

Just before the Great Shutdown, which marked the end of conflict on Cyberton, Scorponok was one of the leaders of the Decepticons, under Shockwave.

IDW Publishing
Scorponok made his first IDW Publishing appearance in the Spotlight issue on Ultra Magnus. A Decepticon with a reputation for completely disregarding what few rules govern the Autobot/Decepticon war, Scorponok was well known for offering Cybertronian technology to races in return for completing his own unscrupulous projects. His latest project took him to Nebulos, where he struck a deal with local business leader Zarak to upgrade Nebulans with Transformer technology for an unknown reason. However, Scorponok was tracked down by Autobot law enforcement officer Ultra Magnus and the two battled. A shot from Scorponok's scorpion mode seemingly inadvertently killed Zarak, and Magnus shot Scorponok in the head.

The Decepticon escaped badly injured. He reappeared in the main storyline as the Transformer behind the Machination, with only his badly damaged head remaining (although he was not revealed until the final issue of The Transformers: Devastation). He had continued his ambitions of merging organics and Transformer technology, creating an army of Headmasters using the body of the kidnapped Sunstreaker as a template to mass-produce Headmaster bodies while using Sunstreaker's severed head as a hub, using his memories to hunt the other Autobots. Eventually, he combined with Abraham Dante, the human head of the Machination, into a copy of his old body. Even with his mobility and power restored he was unable to stop Hunter O'Nion, now merged with Sunstreaker's mind in one of the copy bodies, from escaping.

Now aware of Megatron's intentions for Earth, Scorponok had his mole in Skywatch (a legitimate government anti-Transformer organization) sabotage Grimlock's reawakening. Scorponok approached him with the offer of an alliance, in the hopes Grimlock would distract the Decepticons long enough for his own Machination empire to become entrenched. Grimlock refused and attacked, but Scorponok's new Headmaster powers allowed him to overwhelm the Dinobot. Grimlock escaped, but Scorponok had his agents prepare to take control of the rest of the Dinobots, planning on letting Skywatch kill off Grimlock for them (Spotlight: Grimlock).

Ultra Magnus' schematics indicate that Scorponok's previous alternate mode was a tracked Cybertronian tank.

Mosaic
Scorponok appeared in the Transformers: Mosaic story "The Sting of Scorponok" by Josh "Richter" van Reyk.

Toys
 Generation 1 Scorponok with Zarak (1987)
Scorponok is the second-largest toy from the original Transformers toyline, slightly taller than Trypticon, and second only to his opposite number, Fortress Maximus. Originally, his Tech Spec statistics were printed upside down, resulting in a grossly inaccurate representation of his abilities (suggesting, for example, that his Strength was merely 3). Later production runs of the toy bore modified statistics - though they were again incorrect as they were consistently two points lower than those revealed by plugging Lord Zarak into the chest meter. (This may be due to the blue line of the tech specs card being printed in yet another inverted form -- mirrored, as opposed to upside down.)Super-God Masterforce Black Zarak (1988)
A redeco and retool of the original Scorponok figure with brittle gold plastic.Earthrise Titan Class Scorponok (2020)
A new ane modernized version of the G1 toy that scales with Titans Return Fortress Maximus. He includes Zarak Shield from Transformers Headmasters.Generations Selects Titan Class Black Zarak (2022)
A redeco and retool of Earthrise Scrponok based on the original Black Zarak toy and his appearance in Super-God Masterforce includes battle damage headmaster and Tyrant Spear accessory.

Beast WarsScorponok was one of the original members of Megatron's Darksyde crew who stole the Golden Disk artifact from the Cybertron archives in Beast Wars. He turns into a giant scorpion.

Fun Publications
The Predacon General now known as Megatron gathered a crew of like-minded individuals. While Waspinator and Terrorsaur stole a ship, Megatron, Dinobot, and Scorponok stole the Golden Disk, battling the guards and destroying one, disabling a second, and leaving a third to commandeer a ship to pursue them. Picked up by their ship, they fled and were pursued by two ships - one of which was the Axalon commanded by Optimus Primal, the other the Chromia 10. With a little help from Laserbeak and Buzzsaw (secretly sent by Divebomb to ensure Megatron's plan to change history succeeded) they destroyed one of their pursuers, and the newly christened Darksyde fled into transwarp space, with the Axalon in pursuit - thus beginning the Beast Wars.

Scorponok's pre-Beast Wars mode seems to be based on Energon Scorponok, but no actual toy was created for this character.

Animated series
Scorponok was promoted to second-in-command of the Predacons after forcibly (and literally) ejecting Dinobot from the group, and acted as Megatron's right hand in the first season of the Beast Wars. To survive on the energon-filled planet, he scanned a scorpion as his beast mode.

Scorponok was portrayed as a dangerous combination known as "a thug with a brain". Acting as infantry and a powerful enemy, he also displayed above-average scientific knowledge with an emphasis on chemistry. Although he brutishly shot his barrage of missiles like a "thug", his missiles would more often than not be enhanced via chemical experimentation and inventions. Scorponok has sufficient knowledge about Transformer anatomy and physiology that he was able to completely rebuild Megatron piece by piece after being destroyed by Terrorsaur. His inventions include the Mega Missile, Vibro Rocket, Surveillance Cyber Bee, Mood-Manipulating Cyber Bee, and Cyber Sting fluid. Although he was an inventor, he was largely overshadowed by his comrades' scientific prowess, as well as the fact that most, if not all, of Scorponok's creations didn't work or had some obvious flaw in their design. 
Scorponok had several important roles in season one, such as finding an old Predacon cannon (which he almost lost to Cheetor). He then tried to infect Optimus Primal with a virus that was supposed to make him a coward, but instead made him a berserker. He was partners with Blackarachnia, who betrayed him twice. Scorponok also didn't get along with Terrorsaur because Terrorsaur always wanted to usurp Megatron. Throughout season one, Scorponok's faith in Megatron was unmatched, to the extent of looking up to him. Scorponok was arguably the lone original Predacon who was completely loyal to Megatron; the other four original Predacons - Terrorsaur, Tarantulas, Waspinator, and Dinobot - all tried to usurp Megatron's position as leader at one point in the first season. Megatron did not reciprocate this loyalty and treated Scorponok as disposable as the rest of his minions.

In the season-one finale, he joined Megatron and Terrorsaur at the alien structure, where the Maximals Rattrap and Optimus Primal were trying to get inside to rescue Airazor. Due to the truce, however, and their hopes of the Maximals' possible destruction within the structure, the Predacons decided to help them. They used Scorponok's toxic sting so that they could enter the forcefield in an attempt to retrieve Airazor. Scorponok announced to Megatron that he had one mega-missile to shoot at the Maximals while they were inside.  With their plan to destroy the Maximals thwarted, Megatron, Terrorsaur and Scorponok returned to their base, which proved to play a significant role in the demise of Terrorsaur and Scorponok when their base was hit by the quantum surge.

Scorponok seemingly died along with his rival, Terrorsaur, in the second-season premiere, when they both fell into a pit of magma as the quantum surge hit the planet from the destroyed Vok "Planet Buster". After this, Inferno took his place as Megatron's second-in-command. Ironically, the very thing that supposedly destroyed Scorponok just happens to be one of the few things his armor was immune or resistant to. He is virtually impervious to heat-based attacks; however, magma was the cause of his demise.

 IDW Publishing 
Scorponok had a biography printed in the Beast Wars Sourcebook by IDW Publishing. According to his biography published in the Beast Wars Sourcebook, Scorponok actually survived the events of season two and was turned into a transmetal scorpion, but he remained trapped in the magma, unable to escape until after Megatron was defeated and the Maximals left with him for Cybertron. What happened to Scorponok afterwards is unknown.

Toys
 Beast Wars Scorponok (1996)
The Scorponok toy was repainted as Double Punch in Japan in 1998 and as Botcon Sandstorm in 1999. The commercial for Scorponok referred to him as a "robot in disguise with a killer bee inside!"
 Beast Wars Transmetal ScorponokA transmetal toy of Scorponok was released as McDonald's happy meal toy.

Transformers: Robots in Disguise (2001)

One of the Heralds of Unicron, Mega Zarak, comes from a dimension where he has all but destroyed the Autobots and is the ruler of the Decepticons. Megazarak was noted for his insatiable appetite for destruction and mayhem outstripping that of even his predecessors. Megazarak soon nearly killed the Prime of that reality (later that individual would be taken by Unicron and reborn as Nemesis Prime), and nearly annihilated the Autobots once and for all.

The rest of the Decepticons quickly learned to both fear and respect their new master, and he soon assembled his own personal strike force -including Sunstorm, Dreadwind, Smokejumper, among others. His Mini-Con partner, Caliburn, actually loves the level of carnage his partner causes. Megazarak seems to have no known weaknesses, but he does have a preoccupation: he seeks to destroy Defensor, the only Autobot to have escaped his wrath. Megazarak was released as a special edition figure, along with Sentinel Maximus available at BotCon.

3H Enterprises
Megazarak's only fictional appearance came in the BotCon Transformers: Universe series, where he was shown seeking out the Oracle (of Beast Machines fame) to help track down the last Autobots on Cybertron. He was confronted by Ultra Trion, who valiantly attempted to hold him off, but Megazarak killed him with his main cannon. However, Trion had his victory even in death, as he had bought enough time for the Oracle to be moved. Though this story originally took place in its own continuity, it was stated over a decade later by "Ask Vector Prime", that the "Shall Game" story takes place in the same continuity as Transformers: Robots in Disguise, albeit in an alternate dystopian future. In this future Megazarak swiftly claimed leadership of the Decepticons, creating Toxitron from a poisoned Scourge and using Galvatron's remains to create Megabolt in a bid to control Fortress Maximus. He also used a Robo-Smasher to turn the Bullet Trains and their combined form of Rail Racer and the Build Team and their combined form of Landfill into his minions: Dominus Trannis and Devastator. Despite losing Devastator, Ruination, and Megabolt due to Unicron's interference, Megazarak succeeded in defeating a similarly weakened Autobot force. However, he was eventually defeated when Defensor-formerly Hot Spot, leader of the Protectobots-joined forces with Galvatron's former Predacon minions.

Fun Publications
An alternate Megazarak called himself the "God Emperor Supreme of the Destructicons". With Jhiaxus as his second in command, he devastated his Cybertron and left only the Dinobots as any real opposition and then went looking for more Cybertronians to recruit into his army. After testing dimension-hopping tech with a strike against a G1 reality, he hopped into the war-ravaged Armada universe, leaving only his loyal second-in-command Jhiaxus behind. With Bludgeon, Scourge, Dreadwind, Smokejumper, and Sunstorm, he easily stomped it. Megazarak killed the local Optimus Prime, taunting him that the Matrix inside of him would rot with him, before ripping out his spark and abandoning Optimus's remains on the shores of the Rust Sea. Eventually, this would provide Unicron with the source of his malevolent Herald Nemesis Prime. The Decepticons tried to team up with the Destructicons, even giving Galvatron's own personal Mini-Con, Caliburn, to Megazarak, but this universe was ultimately destroyed. Megazarak was later abducted by Unicron for the Universe War, but Jhiaxus rescued his master from the Cauldron. However, his existence was later learned of by the Defensor who had bested his 3H counterpart, and the Autobot leader set out to challenge and defeat him.

ToysUniverse Megazarak with Caliburn (2004)
In the Transformers: Universe line, Megazarak is a repaint of Armada Megatron (with lights and sound electronics removed).

Transformers: Armada
Megazarak is a brutal warlord. In ancient days, Megazarak was a warlord who the Autobots led by Vector Prime fought and defeated. If the future Time Warriors hadn't stopped him, he'd have become a transdimensional genocide machine like his Robots in Disguise counterpart.

Transformers: Energon

Like his predecessor, the Transformers: Energon incarnation of Scorponok (misspelled Scorpinok in his debut episode) is known as Megazarak in Japan and is a Triple Changer, transforming from robot to scorpion-themed tank to jet.

Animated series
Originally, he was the Grand Chamberlain of the alien world of Planet Q, and sacrificed his life when he detonated the planet's core to stop the attack of Unicron. The spark of the planet's ruler, later to be known as Alpha Q, continued to exist within the dormant Unicron, and set about forming a plan to recreate his homeworld and other worlds that had been consumed by Unicron, using Energon. From Unicron, he recreated Planet Q's armies as the Terrorcons, and resurrected Scorponok to lead them.

Scorponok managed to turn several Decepticons to his and Alpha Q's side, until Megatron was resurrected. Although Scorponok tried to kill the newly reborn Decepticon Leader, Megatron predictably beat Scorponok brutally for trying to usurp the power of Decepticon Leader, and branded him with a Decepticon symbol. Megatron then used Scorponok as a shield against the Autobots' fire on his first attack in his new body (he was eventually repaired by Tidal Wave). However, Scorponok continued to act as a mole for Alpha Q, working towards his master's goals from within Megatron's team. When Megatron came to suspect this, he strapped Scorponok to a meteor and hurled him at Earth's Energon Grid, hoping to force Alpha Q out of hiding to rescue his minion. Scorponok survived the ordeal, and reunited with Alpha Q, entering into an alliance with the Autobots to stop Megatron from reviving Unicron. However, after Scorponok's subsequent defeat by Megatron, the positively charged Energon released from Unicron's head by Alpha Q reacted with the negatively charged Energon vented from Unicron's body by Megatron, tearing open a fissure in space, through which the teams were sucked. In this new region of space, all of the planets consumed by Unicron had been recreated, but Scorponok was to meet an unfortunate fate as Megatron completely reprogrammed him, turning him into a true Decepticon.

During his alliance with the Autobots, Scorponok had earned an admirer in Ironhide, who attempted several times to make him remember who he was and to turn him away from Megatron's service. His words continuously fell on deaf ears, and the two friends-turned-foes had their final conflict on Cybertron as Optimus Prime battled the Unicron-possessed Galvatron. Both combatants were rendered unconscious, but Scorponok was the first to recover as Ironhide's Spark began to glow - Optimus Prime was calling on all his troops to lend him their strength. With the last of his own energy, Scorponok transported Ironhide to Prime's side so that he could join in the ultimate combination, but told him that he was not doing it for him - he was doing it so that Prime could save Galvatron from Unicron. And with that final act, Scorponok died.

The Japanese version of Ironhide and Scorponok's final exchange adds a touch of ambiguity to their relationship. From his reappearance as a Decepticon up to this point, Ironhide has been attempting to make Scorponok remember Alpha Q, while Scorponok has insisted that Megatron is the only master he has known. His final line, however - a near-whispered "Our planet..." - suggests that he may well indeed remember Alpha Q, and that he may be serving Megatron out of his own free will (perhaps, as some earlier dialogue suggests, for giving him new life as Decepticon when he would have died otherwise). Scorponok's line survives into the Energon dub, but Ironhide's reaction ("Scorponok? So... you do...") does not, depriving the exchange of the punctuation which makes its meaning clear.

In the 33rd episode, "Scorponok's Scars", it is revealed that the spark within Scorponok is not actually that of the general of Planet Q - his spark was completely extinguished in his last act of sacrifice. Alpha Q instead used the wandering Spark of a Decepticon to recreate Scorponok, programming it to act and think the way the real Scorponok did. For an unexplained reason, however, this episode was not dubbed into English.

Dreamwave Productions
In Dreamwave Productions' Transformers: Energon comic book series, Scorponok was a former lieutenant of Megatron. Unlike Megatron, he preferred to actively participate in combat, his brutal and 'right-to-the-point' tactics earning him the respect of his troops. Scorponok's precise history after this is unknown, although Starscream implied he was one of those who fought against Unicron.

Ten years after the defeat of Unicron, Scorponok sought out the Decepticons who were not happy with the current Autobot-Decepticon alliance, and found a new ally in Alpha-Quintesson who gave him and his followers new, energon-enhanced hyper-modes for finding Energon to re-activate Unicron. As his first act, Scorponok killed the always treacherous Starscream, stating he never knew why Megatron kept him around.

Following Alpha-Q's orders, he led his new army, the Terrorcons to Earth, planning to suck the planet dry of Energon. During his first assault, his team captured Kicker, whom Scorponok realised could help him locate Energon. After soundly defeating the Autobots, led by Optimus Prime, Scorponok started the mining of Energon. The Autobots' second attack, aided by the Omnicons, took him by surprise and with the mined Energon blown up, Scorponok was gated away and reprimanded by his master.

Learning from his mistakes, Scorponok didn't take any chances in his next attack. He unleashed four huge armies of the cloned Terrorcons on four cities of Earth, while he hitched a ride on a tower of the Earth defence grid, arriving from space to the Yukon Territory Autobot station. Thus, avoiding the warning systems, Scorponok took the three Autobots Ironhide, Overload and Dropshot by surprise and took them out easily. However, just as he wanted to claim the defense system, he was challenged by Megatron, who was recently freed from his imprisonment in Unicron (in flashbacks we would see Starscream warning Megatron about Scorponok's ambitions).

Megatron and Scorponok battled it out, both verbally and physically. Their philosophies, subtle and blunt, clashed just like they themselves did on the battlefield. Figuring that Megatron was drained of energy by using his teleportation powers, Scorponok grounded him and buried him under a hill, but then was stabbed in the back by Megatron, who was far from finished. Burning him from the inside out with his energon sword, Megatron left the empty husk of what was Scorponok behind.

Dreamwave went bankrupt and the comic was cancelled, but the official bio of Hasbro's Cybertron Dark Scorponok follows this Energon comic continuity, where Scorponok is reanimated by the energy of Unicron, and follows his orders while hoping to regain his spark.

Fun Publications

The character appeared in the Transformers: Cybertron comic strip exclusive to the Official Transformers' Collectors Club, transported into the Cybertron animated series timeline by reality warps resulting from the black hole created by Unicron's destruction.

Dark Scorponok first appears in the third issue of the comic, as Vector Prime warns that Unicron could bring more minions to battle the Autobots, Dark Scorponok rises from the dead. Later, an Autobot named Skyfall arrives in his ship at a spaceport only to discover the place abandoned, until he is attacked by Scrapmetal and Dark Scorponok. As Scorponok continues to attack Skyfall, Skyfall is buried in rubble. The Mini-Cons of Ramjet find Scorponok and lure him to the Autobots. Safeguard attempts to defend Alpha Trion's chamber from Scorponok, then is joined by Sentinel Maximus. Scorponok fights madly, ignoring all injuries to himself. While the other Autobots defend Vector Prime tries to get the nearby autoguns online. Scorponok stings Sentinel Maximus who nearly shuts down due to the cyber-venom. The autoguns come online and blast Scorponok.

Toys
 Energon Ultra ScorponokA Triple Changer.
 Cybertron Ultra Dark ScorponokEnergon Scorponok returned in the Transformers: Cybertron toyline. Now called Dark Scorponok, his toy biography cites his death as that seen in the Dreamwave comic book, at Megatron's hands, rather than the cartoon's depiction of his passing.
A retool of the Energon toy, he is a homage to Black Zarak. He is a zombie who hungers for the lifeforce of other Transformers, much in the wave of victims of the Transorganic Dweller.
 Titanium 3 inch ScorponokA 3 inch tall non-transforming Scorponok toy was released in the Transformers: Titanium line. Though the toy comes in Energon colors, his tech specs fit more with original Decepticon Scorponok's character.

Transformers Cinematic Universe
{{Transformers character|
 name =Scorponok
|image =Scorponok-moviepicture.jpg
|caption =Scorponok
|affiliation =Decepticon
|subgroup =Deluxe Beasts, Legends
|rank =3
|function =Hunter, Tracker
|partner =Blackout, Grindor
|motto ="Autobots are dead as soon as they step in the sand."
"The opportunity to destroy is the only reward I need."
|alternatemodes =Giant mechanical scorpion
|series =Transformers film series
|engvoice =
|japanvoice =
}}
Scorponok appears in the live-action Transformers film directed by Michael Bay. His machine form is a mechanized scorpion and is the only Decepticon in the film that does not transform into a humanoid robot (though a toy of him has a robot mode), but is able to dive under sand or other soft landforms and burrow under the surface to attack. Screenwriter Roberto Orci indicated that this Scorponok is conceptually closer to the Beast Wars character than the original; he does bear a noticeable resemblance to the McDonald's Transmetal Scorponok figure (see above). He is Blackout's partner, similar to the role that cassettes such as Ravage and Laserbeak served under Soundwave. Scorponok is armed with missile launchers, spinning pincers (which can also be formatted into drills for burrowing) and an impaling spike that represents the stinger on his tail. Scorponok can be seen strapped to Blackout's back in the video game, and is playable as a character on some consoles. When he is playable, the transformation button, instead of causing a transformation, instead makes him dive into the ground (or attempt to do so if he's over hard concrete).

Books
Scorponok appears in the prequel novel Transformers: Ghosts of Yesterday, where he is used in an assault by Blackout to injure Optimus Prime, although he is defeated. Blackout later uses him to infiltrate the Ark, disabling it. He is thrown out by Ratchet.

The children's book Transformers - Meet The Decepticons by Jennifer Frantz has a slightly different ending than the film. This book has all six Decepticons leaving Earth together after being defeated by the Autobots, instead of having most of their numbers die.

IDW Publishing
In the second issue of the Transformers: Movie Prequel comic distributed by Target stores online, Scorponok (referred to as Blackout's pet by Starscream) is among the Decepticons who come to Earth under Starscream's command. While his role is minor, it is notable that this comic shows Scorponok's robot mode for the first time. While it is visually similar to the other movie Transformers, he retains the claws and tail of his movie form, giving him an appearance not unlike his Beast Wars incarnation.

Movie plot
In the film, he and his partner Blackout attack the SOCCENT Operations Base in Qatar. Scorponok chases eight Special Forces soldiers across the desert, eventually killing trooper Donnelly, wounding Figueroa, and killing several Qatari soldiers before being wounded in an attack by two A-10 Thunderbolt IIs and an AC-130 Spectre gunship. With the tip of his tail blown off, Scorponok burrows under the desert sands, and is not seen again for the rest of the film. However, the survivors take the damaged tail and bring it aboard a transport plane en route back to the U.S. While examining the tail, it suddenly goes wild, but Lennox and Epps manage to restrain it. The soldiers also discover through the damage on the tail that while robot armor is impervious to bullets, it can easily be weakened by anti-tank sabot rounds.

In Revenge of the Fallen, Scorponok appears briefly once in Egypt with his tail repaired and participates in the final battle. He bursts out of the sand and disembowels Jetfire, who in turn kills him by smashing his head with his fist, avenging Donnelly and the Qatari soldiers. However, Scorponok's short-lived presence is instrumental towards Jetfire's death. Jetfire, being the eldest Transformer in the film, had been malfunctioning since his reawakening, and Scorponok's actions severely weakened Jetfire, who then sacrifices himself for spare parts to give Optimus Prime the means to defeat The Fallen.

Scorponok has a toy in the Transformers: Dark of the Moon toyline, but he does not appear in the film after his demise.

Titan Magazine
In a later issue, set after the events of the film, Ironhide aids the human military in hunting Scorponok. The Decepticon attacks Ironhide and uses his tongue to drill into the Autobot's neck, sending him into a frenzy. One of the humans manages to fire at Scorponok's tongue. Ironhide regains control and smashes Scorponok to death.In "Twilight's Last Gleaming part 3", Starscream and Scorponok attack the Autobots Arcee, Armorhide, Elita-One, Longarm, Skyblast, and Strongarm on the Moon. The Autobots flee to Earth, which is exactly what Starscream hoped they would do.Toys
 Transformers Voyager Blackout with Scorponok (2007)
A non-poseable Scorponok mini-figurine comes with the Blackout toy and stores in Blackout's rear compartment in helicopter mode.
 Transformers Deluxe Scorponok (2007)
A detailed Deluxe sized toy, Scorponok is a mechanical scorpion covered in gears and military warning symbols. In his scorpion form, running him across a flat surface will activate gears on his underside, causing his claws to rotate. Pushing on the elongated rear of his stinger will cause it to slide forward until it hits a stopper. In this mode, he can combine with Voyager Blackout figure (in helicopter mode) so that when Blackout's rotors are turned, Scorponok's claws will also rotate. The face slides down on to the underbelly, the claws are rotated down to face the new "front" of the figure, and the sides of the scorpion mode detach and rotate down to become the new legs. The sole appearance of this humanoid robot mode was in the second Target store exclusive online movie prequel comic.
In late 2007, a special bonus pack was sold with Ultimate Bumblebee packaged together with Deluxe Decepticon Brawl and Scorponok.
A Toys "R" Us exclusive gift pack with both Voyager Blackout and Deluxe Scorponok was sold under the name "Desert Attack".
 Transformers Deluxe Scorponok Screen Battle: Desert Attack (2008)
A redeco of Deluxe Scorponok comes packaged in this mini-diorama with figurines of Capt. Lennox, Epps and Figueroa.
 Transformers Legends Bumblebee vs. Scorponok (2008)
A new mold for Scorponok as a Legends figure, slightly larger than the one included with Blackout and able to transform to robot mode.
 Revenge of the Fallen Deluxe Stalker Scorponok (2009)
A black redeco of the Deluxe figure. Like the previous release, he is able to combine with the Voyager Grindor figure (a gray repaint of Blackout).
 Revenge of the Fallen Voyager Grindor with Scorponok (2009)
A gray redeco of Voyager Blackout with Scorponok.
 Transformers Legends Stalker Scorponok (2011)
A black redeco of the Legends figure.
 Dark of the Moon Cyberverse Blackout with Scorponok (2011)
A new type of Blackout and Scorponok which are Cyberverse molds. Scorponok can be placed into the back of the MH-53 Helicopter like the Voyager's from the previous movies.
 Studio Series 08 Leader Class Blackout (2018)
Scorponok appears with Blackout with a new mold. He can be slotted onto Blackout’s back in robot mode or underneath his helicopter mode. His tail and claws are posable, and he has been scaled down significantly compared to his original version.

Transformers Animated

Scorponok appears in the Transformers Animated comic series, based on the film incarnation, but colored like the G1 counterpart.

IDw Publishing
In issue #3, Bots of Science, Scorponok witnessed Ratchet introducing himself to Oil Slick, who would later infect the Autobot medic with Cosmic Rust. However, Ratchet manages to sneak the antidote from him.

AllSpark Almanac
Megazarak used to be the Decepticon leader. When the Decepticons first arose as a subfaction of the Destrons, Megazarak was their leader. However, he was exiled by Megatron, who then took over his position. 

Kre-O Transformers

Fictional biography
I'm SCORPONOK, and I'm always one step ahead of the game. If you think you can outsmart me, you've got another thing coming – in the form of my toxic tail! I'm big, I'm bad, and if the DECEPICONS know what's good for 'em, pretty soon I'll be in charge!

Rival: Galvatron

Big Plan: Take over the Decepticons. Conquer Earth.

Favorite Hangout: The biggest throne he can find.

ToysKre-0 Transformers Kreon Micro-Changer Scorponok (2012)
Part of the blind packed preview wave of Kreon Micro-Changers.

Timelines: Pirates vs. Knights
Botcon 2014 would introduce a new incarnation of Scorponok, depicted as the G1 giant Headmaster passed down to Zarak's son Olin.

ToysBotcon Decepticon Pirate Scorponok with Olin Zarak (2014)
Part of the five figure package; a remold of Energon Scorponok featuring a brand new Headmaster head as Olin Zarak.

Timelines: Beast Wars
The Beast Wars Shattered Glass story "Shattered Destiny" introduced a heroic incarnation of the Predacon Scorponok who served as part of a heroic crew of Predacons under Megatron.

Transformers: Robots in Disguise (2015)

In the Robots in Disguise series, Scorponok is a Decepticon with a scorpion alternate mode and a humanoid robot mode.

He and his partners Glowstrike and Sabrehorn lead a group of Decepticons who escaped the prison ship Alchemor and it crashed on Earth, whom they dispatch on various missions in an apparent bid to repair the Alchemor and enable their escape from Earth. Unlike the other Scorponoks, this one does not share the archetypical transformation scheme.

Animated Series
Appearing first in Metal Meltdown, Scorponok and Glowstrike express displeasure at Kickback's sycophancy and Sabrehorn's failure to procure equipment to rebuild the Alchemor. Lamenting at the quality of the troops they have, both Decepticons are surprised when Steeljaw appears and introduces himself.

In Misdirection, having been promised by Steeljaw that he will provide them with elite warriors, Scorponok goes to rendezvous with him at a drive-in theatre with the Mini-Cons Bludgeon and Clout. Also meeting up with Crazybolt, Scorponok was irritated by the other Decepticon's speed philosophy and lack of patience. When they were confronted by Bumblebee and Grimlock, Scorponok managed to pin the Dinobot with relative ease. After Bumblebee managed to distract Scorponok by claiming Steeljaw was untrustworthy and wanted the Earth's 'magic', both he and Crazybolt were defeated. Steeljaw was later revealed to have indeed tricked Scorponok so that he could take his place among the Decepticon's leadership.

ToysRobots in Disguise'' Warrior class Scorponok (2016)

References

External links

 Scorponok at TFWiki.net The Transformers Wiki

Villains in animated television series
Comics characters introduced in 1986
Transformers characters
Fictional characters with superhuman strength
Fictional commanders
Fictional generals
Fictional giants
Fictional henchmen
Fictional scientists
Scorpions in popular culture
Fictional arachnids
Fictional locations
Fictional buildings and structures
Fictional fortifications